The Texas League is a Minor League Baseball league which has operated in the South Central United States since 1902. It is classified as a Double-A league. Despite the league's name, only its five South Division teams are actually based in the state of Texas; the five North Division teams are located in Arkansas, Kansas, Missouri, and Oklahoma. 

The league was founded in 1888 and ran through 1892. It was called the Texas Association in 1895, the Texas-Southern League in 1896, and again as the Texas League from 1897 to 1899. It was revived as a Class D league in 1902, moved to Class C in 1904 where it played through 1910 (except for 1906 as Class D again), played at Class B until 1920, and finally moved up to Class A in 1921. The Texas League, like many others, shut down during World War II. From 1959 to 1961, the Texas League and the Mexican League formed the Pan American Association. The two leagues played a limited interlocking schedule and post-season championship. By 1971, the Texas League and the Southern League had both decreased to seven teams. They played an interlocking schedule with the Southern League known as the Dixie Association. The two leagues played separate playoffs. The Texas League has operated its own schedule since 1972. Following MLB's reorganization of the minor leagues in 2021, it operated as the Double-A Central for one season before switching back to its previous moniker in 2022. 

The Texas League's name is well known due to its association with a particular aspect of the game. A bloop single that drops between the infielders and outfielders has been called a Texas Leaguer since the 1890s, The hit was attribute to Ollie Pickering who often hit them.

History
Around the advent of the 21st century, the Texas League witnessed a great deal of change. Teams once known as the Jackson Mets,  El Paso Diablos, Shreveport Captains, and Wichita Wranglers all relocated to new cities and bigger stadiums.

In 2019, the San Antonio Missions relocated to Amarillo, Texas, becoming the Amarillo Sod Poodles. At the same time, the Triple-A Colorado Springs Sky Sox of the Pacific Coast League (PCL) moved to San Antonio to continue on as the Missions at the Triple-A level.

The start of the 2020 season was postponed due to the COVID-19 pandemic before ultimately being cancelled on June 30. As part of Major League Baseball's 2021 reorganization of the minor leagues, the Texas League was temporarily renamed the "Double-A Central" for the 2021 season. Following MLB's acquisition of the rights to the names of the historical minor leagues, the Double-A Central was renamed the Texas League effective with the 2022 season.

Current teams

Texas League timeline

   

 In 1971, the Southern League and Texas League were each down to seven teams, so they formed the Dixie Association for one season. They played interlocking schedules but held their own separate playoffs.

 The Wichita Wind Surge were originally slated to begin play in 2020 in the Pacific Coast League as the Triple-A affiliate of the Miami Marlins.  However, the cancellation of the 2020 season and the 2021 realignment of the minor leagues resulted in Wichita dropping to Double-A without playing a Triple-A game.

Complete list of Texas League teams (1902–present)

Note: • An "^" indicates that team's article redirects to an article of an active team in a different league 

 Albuquerque Dodgers
 Albuquerque Dukes
 Alexandria Aces
 Amarillo Giants
 Amarillo Gold Sox
 Amarillo Sonics
 Amarillo Sod Poodles
 Ardmore Rosebuds
 Ardmore Territorians
 Arkansas Travelers
 Austin Braves
 Austin Senators
 Beaumont Exporters
 Beaumont Golden Gators

 Beaumont Oilers
 Beaumont Roughnecks

 Cleburne Railroaders
 Corpus Christi Giants
 Corpus Christi Hooks
 Corsicana Oil Citys
 Corsicana Oilers
 Dallas Eagles
 Dallas Giants
 Dallas Griffins
 Dallas Marines
 Dallas Rangers
 Dallas Rebels
 Dallas Steers
 Dallas Submarines
 Dallas-Fort Worth Spurs
 El Paso Diablos
 El Paso Sun Dodgers
 El Paso Sun Kings
 Fort Worth Cats
 Fort Worth Panthers
 Frisco RoughRiders
 Galveston Buccaneers
 Galveston Pirates
 Galveston Sand Crabs
 Greenville Hunters
 Houston Buffaloes

 Houston Mud Cats
 Jackson Generals
 Jackson Mets
 Lafayette Drillers
 Longview Cannibals
 Memphis Blues
 Midland Angels
 Midland Cubs
 Midland RockHounds
 Northwest Arkansas Naturals
 Oklahoma City Indians
 Oklahoma City Mets
 Paris Eisenfelder's Homeseekers
 Paris Parisites
 Paris Red Ravens
 Paris Steers
 Rio Grande Valley Giants
 Round Rock Express^
 San Antonio Aces
 San Antonio Bears
 San Antonio Brewers
 San Antonio Bronchos
 San Antonio Bullets
 San Antonio Dodgers
 San Antonio Indians
 San Antonio Missions

 Sherman-Denison Students
 Shreveport Braves
 Shreveport Captains
 Shreveport Gassers
 Shreveport Pirates
 Shreveport Sports
 Shreveport Swamp Dragons
 Springfield Cardinals
 Temple Boll Weevils
 Texarkana Casket Makers
 Tulsa Drillers
 Tulsa Oilers
 Tyler Sports
 Victoria Giants
 Victoria Rosebuds
 Victoria Toros
 Waco Cubs
 Waco Navigators
 Waco Steers
 Waco Tigers
 Wichita Falls Spudders
 Wichita Pilots
 Wichita Wind Surge
 Wichita Wranglers

League champions and award winners

Hall of fame

See also

List of Texas League stadiums

References

Sources
Baseball in the Lone Star State: Texas League's Greatest Hits, Tom Kayser and David King, Trinity University Press 2005

Notes

External links

 
Sports leagues established in 1888
1888 establishments in Texas
Organizations based in Fort Worth, Texas
Minor baseball leagues in the United States